Dighiar is a village in Keotirunway block of Darbhanga district in Bihar, India. This is 15 km  from Darbhanga and 19 km from Madhubani city.

The name dighiar came because of its location on the bank of a big pond (Badh Pokhar) which means side of a pond.

Languages

The official languages of this village are Urdu, Hindi and English.

Constituency
This village comes under the Keoti assembly constituency and Madhubani Loksabha constituency.

Panchayat
Dighiar has its own panchayat named Dighiar panchayat. It is the smallest panchayat in Darbhanga district.
present panchayat sameti is Md. Naushad Ali (2016-2021)

Nearest city
Nearest city is Darbhanga and Madhubani.

Population

The population in Dighiar village is 5,062 as per the survey of census during 2011 by Indian Government.
There are 993 households in Dighiar.
There are 2,680 males; There are 2,382 females.
Dighiar Sex Ratio
While the population is 5,062, there are 2,680 males and 2,382 females are there. Further the children below 6 years of age are 1,027 of which 550 are males and 477 are females.
Dighiar Scheduled cast and Tribes
Total Scheduled Cast are 652. Total Scheduled Tribe are 3.
Dighiar Literacy Rate
Literates are 2,152 of which males are 1,294 and Females are 858. There are 2,910 Illiterates.
Dighiar Workers Population
Workers in the State of Dighiar are calculated as 1,384 of which 1,299 are males and 85 are females. Further 86 are regular and 1,298 are Irregular i.e. get jobs only few days in a month. There are 3,678 Non Workers (include students, house wives, and children above 6 years also.)

Education and occupation
The literacy rate of the village is 47.01% compared to the literacy rate of state 47%. The literacy rate of the village is better than state literacy rate. The rate of literacy is satisfactory. . The female literacy rate is 35.36% compared to male literacy rate of 58.36%.he total working population is 33.07% of the total population. 61.07% of the men are working population . 4.35% of the women are working population. The main working population is 28.13% of the total population. 52.63% of the men are main working population . 2.99% of the women are main working population. While the marginal working population is 4.95% of the total population. 8.44% of the men are marginal working population. 1.36% of the women are marginal working population. The total non working population is 66.93% of the total population. 38.93% of the men are non working population. 95.65% of the women are non working population.

Schools and institutions

Madarsa Baitul Uloom
Madarsa Baitul Uloom was established in the year 1973. It is managed by the Dept. of Education. The school is a P + UP & Sec/H.Sec school. The coeducation status is co-educational. The total number of students is 445. The medium of instruction in is Urdu. There are 4 classrooms and one teacher.

Economics
Agriculture is the prime source of income of villagers.
Major crops of Dighiar are rice, wheat, mustard, murwa, and masoor. Mango is produced widely in the village.

Lohia sawachh Bihar
This village has been declared open defecation free village as every house in the village has their own toilet,

Weather

References

Villages in Darbhanga district